John Anthony Bailey (born 1 April 1957) is an English former professional footballer who was a member of Everton's 1984 FA Cup Final-winning team. He made more than 400 appearances in the Football League for Blackburn Rovers, Everton, Newcastle United and Bristol City as a left back, and represented England at 'B' international level.

References

1957 births
Living people
English footballers
Footballers from Liverpool
Association football fullbacks
FA Cup Final players
English Football League players
Blackburn Rovers F.C. players
Everton F.C. players
Newcastle United F.C. players
Bristol City F.C. players